Gander may refer to:

 Gander (goose), an adult male goose

Places

Canada
 Gander, Newfoundland and Labrador, a town in Canada
 Gander (electoral district), a provincial electoral district
 Gander Academy, an elementary school in Gander
 Gander Collegiate, a high school in Gander
 Gander International Airport, a major airport in Newfoundland and Labrador
 CFB Gander, also known as 9 Wing Gander, a Canadian air force base co-located at Gander International Airport
 Gander Bay, Newfoundland
 Gander Lake, Newfoundland
 Gander River, Newfoundland
 Gander terrane, a continental fragment in Newfoundland
 Gander Island, part of the Moore Islands, British Columbia

France/Luxembourg
 Gander (Moselle), a small river

People
 Gander (surname)
 "Gander", nickname of Monty Stratton (1912-1982), Major League Baseball pitcher

Fictional characters
 Gladstone Gander, a Walt Disney fictional character created by cartoonist Carl Barks
 Goosetave Gander, a fictional character of the Scrooge McDuck Universe, Gladstone Gander's father
 Richard Gander, in the 1972 British sitcom Alcock and Gander

Other uses
 Gander (horse), a thoroughbred race horse
 Gander Stakes, an ungraded stakes race for New York bred Thoroughbred race horses
 Gander (dog), a Newfoundland dog, recipient of the Dickin Medal for bravery
 Kokusai Ku-8, a 1940s Japanese light transport monoplane codenamed Gander by the Allies
 USS Gander, a Danube class starship in the science fiction franchise Star Trek

See also
 Gander Mountain, a hunting and fishing store
 Nicolae Dobrin (1947-2007), Romanian footballer nicknamed Gâscanul ("The Gander")
 Ganda (disambiguation)